A Pledge to God  is a South Korean television series starring Han Chae-young, Bae Soo-bin, Oh Yoon-ah and Lee Chun-hee. The series aired four episodes every Saturday on MBC TV from 20:45 to 23:10 (KST), from November 24, 2018 to February 16, 2019.

Synopsis
Little Hyeon Woo is gravely ill and needs a bone marrow transplant. His current parents are not compatible donors either. His doctor advises his parents that cord blood of a sibling could be a potential donor. However, his birth parents are no longer married to each other.

Cast

Main
 Han Chae-young as Seo Ji-young, TV host
 Bae Soo-bin as Kim Jae-wook, formerly married to Ji-young, architect and later president & CEO of Cheonji Construction
 Oh Yoon-ah as Woo Na-kyung, second wife of Jae-wook, general counsel of Cheonji Construction
 Lee Chun-hee as Song Min-ho, second husband of Ji-young, carpenter

Supporting

Ji-young's family
 Wang Seok-hyeon as Song Hyeon Woo, eldest son of Ji-young and Jae-wook, in custody of Ji-young and Min-ho
 Ha Yi-an as young Hyun-woo
 Lee Hwi-hyang as Heo Eun-sook, Ji-young's mother

People at Cheonji Construction
 Park Geun-hyung as Kim Sang-chun, father of Jae-hee and Jae-wook, chairman of family-controlled Cheonji Construction
 Kang Boo-ja as Lee Pil-nam, Sang-chun's wife
 Oh Hyun-kyung as Kim Jae-hee, older sister of Jae-wook, heads the family company foundation
 Byung Hun as Jo Seung-hoon, son of Jae-hee
 Nam Ki-won as Kim Joon-seo, second son of Ji-young and Jae-wook, in custody of Jae-wook and Na-kyung
 Kim Hyun-bin as young Joon-seo

Others
 Chu Ye-jin as Na Hae-ji, Hyeon Woo's girlfriend from high school
 Jung Min-sung as Ji Do-yeob
 Kim Hee-jung as Ahn Joo-ryun, producer of Ji-young's program at the TV broadcaster
 Bae Hae-sun as Oh Sun-joo, secretary to Na-jyung	
 Choi Phillip as Jung Kyung-soo, director of Ji-young's program at the TV broadcaster
 Oh Eun-ho as Hwang Ma-ri
 Lee Jin-hee as Na Hae-Jim’s mother.

Production
The first script reading took place on October 5, 2018 at MBC Broadcasting Station in Sangam-dong, Seoul, South Korea.

Original soundtrack

Part 1

Part 2

Part 3

Part 4

Part 5

Part 6

Part 7

Part 8

Viewership
In this table,  represent the lowest ratings and  represent the highest ratings.

Awards and nominations

Notes

References

External links
  
 

Korean-language television shows
2018 South Korean television series debuts
MBC TV television dramas
South Korean melodrama television series
2019 South Korean television series endings